The West Regional League is one of three Regional Leagues operated by the Scottish Rugby Union, which play at a level below that of the National League structure.

Winners of the top division progress to Scottish National League Division Three, which was Greenock Wanderers in 2018-19

Tennents West Regional League 2021-2022

In League One, with the exception of Carrick the teams remained the same as the 2019-20 season, due to the covid 19 pandemic. In League Three, the Isle of Mull RFC moved to non-league status.

See also
Caledonia Regional League
East Regional League

References 

Scottish Regional League (rugby union)
6